Events in the year 1852 in Belgium.

Incumbents

Monarch: Leopold I
Head of government: Charles Rogier (to 31 October); Henri de Brouckère (from 31 October)

Events
 12 February – State visit of Queen Victoria and Prince Albert to Belgium.
 15 April – Postal convention between Belgium and the Office of the Prince of Tour and Taxis signed in Brussels.
 24 May – Provincial elections
 8 June – Partial legislative elections of 1852.
 22 August – Franco-Belgian conventions on intellectual property and tariffs.
 31 October – Henri de Brouckère replaces Charles Rogier as Prime Minister.
 7 November – Théodore de Montpellier consecrated as bishop of Liège in succession to Cornelius van Bommel.

Publications
Periodicals
Almanach royal officiel (Brussels, Librairie Polytechnique)
 La Belgique Horticole, vol. 2.

Guidebooks and directories
 Belgium and the Rhine (London, David Bogue).
 Guide pittoresque du voyageur en Belgique: Itinéraire artistique, industriel et manufacturier (Guide Richard, 7th edition; Paris, L. Maison)
 Murray's Handbook for Belgium and the Rhine (London, John Murray)

Other
 Collection des discours prononcés aux distributions de prix des athénées royaux (Tournai, Bureau du Moniteur de l'Enseignement)
 Henri Alexis Brialmont, Considérations politiques et militaires sur la Belgique, vol. 3 (Brussels, M. Hayez)
 Jules de Saint-Genois, Feuillets détachés

Art and architecture

Paintings
 Louis Gallait,  Gypsy Woman with Two Children

Births
 24 January – Alexander Struys, painter (died 1941)
 7 March – Constant de Deken, missionary (died 1896)
 25 March – Gérard Cooreman, politician (died 1926)
 27 March – Jan van Beers, artist (died 1927) 
 10 April – Arthur Vierendeel, engineer (died 1940)
 21 April – Edward Maene, sculptor (died 1931)
 9 June – Frans Van Kuyck, artist (died 1915)
 12 July – Henry Moeller, review editor (died 1918)
 31 August – Joris Helleputte, architect and politician (died 1925)
 20 September – Édouard Empain, engineer-entrepreneur (died 1929)
 2 December – Lucien Bia, soldier (died 1892)

Deaths
 28 January – Augustin Dumon-Dumortier (born 1791), industrialist and politician
 7 April – Cornelius van Bommel (born 1790), bishop of Liège
 6 May – Charles-Louis-Joseph Hanssens (born 1777), theatre director
 17 October – Henri Decaisne (born 1799), painter

References

 
Belgium
Years of the 19th century in Belgium
1850s in Belgium
Belgium